Jean Fabre may refer to:

 Jean-Henri Fabre (1823–1915), French entomologist and author
 Jean-Pierre Fabre (born 1952), Togolese politician
 Jean Fabre (rugby union) (born 1935), French rugby union player

See also
 Jan Fabre (born 1958), Belgian multidisciplinary artist, playwright, stage director, choreographer and designer